The Central District of Bushehr County is in Bushehr province, Iran. At the 2006 census, its population was 207,891 in 51,210 households. The following census in 2011 counted 251,120 people in 66,788 households. At the latest census in 2016, the district had 290,359 inhabitants living in 83,177 households.

References 

Districts of Bushehr Province
Populated places in Bushehr County